Glenn Conway LeBleu, known as Conway LeBleu (October 4, 1918 – October 11, 2007), was an American politician from Louisiana who served in the Louisiana House of Representatives from 1964 to 1988.

Early life and education
He graduated from Lake Charles High School in 1935. He enlisted in the United States Army Air Forces in 1942, served in the Pacific Theater during World War II and became a staff sergeant. He then attended McNeese State College and Colorado State University, and graduated from Louisiana State University with a Bachelor of Science in animal husbandry in 1950.

Later life
He is buried at McCall Cemetery, Grand Chenier, Cameron Parish, Louisiana.

References

1918 births
2007 deaths
20th-century American politicians
Burials in Louisiana
Cajun people
Politicians from Lake Charles, Louisiana
People from Cameron Parish, Louisiana
Farmers from Louisiana
Ranchers from Louisiana
Parish jurors and commissioners in Louisiana
Democratic Party members of the Louisiana House of Representatives
McNeese State University alumni
Colorado State University alumni
Louisiana State University alumni
United States Army Air Forces personnel of World War II
United States Army Air Forces non-commissioned officers